Dearth means lack, shortage or scarcity.  It may also refer to:

People
 Henry Golden Dearth (1864–1919), American painter
James Dearth (born 1976), retired National Football League long snapper, primarily for the New York Jets, also played for the Cleveland Browns and Tarleton State University Texans
John Dearth (1920 – 1984), British actor
'John Wesley Dearth III,' full name of American rock musician John Wesley (born 1962), American rock musician
 Dearth Voyd, character in the TV show Monkey Magic